Daniel Bernstein is a composer for video games and movies. Born in Leningrad in the Soviet Union (now part of Russia), he received a B.S. in computer science and an M.A. in music composition from the University of Virginia. Bernstein started in games in 1996 "working in development and sound design". He has also worked as a composer for Monolith Productions where he collaborated with Guy Whitmore on titles such as Blood and Claw. Outside of video games, he also wrote the soundtrack for short movies (Kansas in 1998 and Maid of Honor in 1999).

Changing career, he joined WildTangent as the Director of Product Strategy, and later left in 2002 to create Sandlot Games.

While still acting as Sandlot's CEO, he returned to composition with the soundtrack to The Penitent Man in 2010.

Video game credits

References

External links
 Homepage
 
 

Video game composers
Monolith Productions people
American company founders
Russian emigrants to the United States
Businesspeople from Saint Petersburg
American technology chief executives
Living people
Year of birth missing (living people)